Gazania ciliaris is one of the flowers known as a calendula, native predominanty to the Western Cape province, South Africa, where it occurs from Vanrhynsdorp to the Eastern Cape near Joubertina.

Description
The flowers are yellow-to-orange, and born on distinctively setose-to-ciliate (hairy) petioles. 
The flower's involucre is glabrous and a sub-cylindrical shape, with a fleshy truncate base. 

The involucre bracts/scales are a distinguishing characteristics of this species. At the top of the involucre, it usually has two or three rows of terminal scales. These are finely acuminate and the margins of the inner row are distinctly ciliate. Along the length of the involucre, it can also have several parietal scales, which are usually deltoid acuminate and somewhat arranged in a row around the involucre (a characteristic shared with Gazania linearis). 

The leaves are linear or linear-lanceolate, and can be either simple or pinnate. The upper leaf surface is usually rough and the lower surface is tomentose (white woolly). There are usually distinctive spine-like cilia/hairs along the lower leaf margins. 

In its growth form, G. ciliaris is a compact herbaceous perennial, and forms basal rosettes with only relatively short stems. The bases of old dead leaves usually do not persist around the stem as they do in Gazania linearis.

References

Flora of South Africa
ciliaris